Alunișu may refer to several places in Romania:

 Alunișu, a village in Băiculești Commune, Argeș County
 Alunișu, a village in Brăduleț Commune, Argeș County
 Alunișu, a village in Sâncraiu Commune, Cluj County
 Alunișu, a village in Cornățelu Commune, Dâmbovița County
 Alunișu, a district in the town of Măgurele, Ilfov County
 Alunișu, a village in Spineni Commune, Olt County

See also
Aluniș (disambiguation)
Alunișul (disambiguation)